Camp Schwab is a United States Marine Corps camp located in northeastern Okinawa Prefecture, Japan, that is currently home to the 4th Marine Regiment and other elements of the 28,000 American servicemen based on the island. The Camp was dedicated in 1959 in honor of Medal of Honor recipient Albert E. Schwab who was killed in action during the Battle of Okinawa.

Camp Schwab primarily located in the city of Nago (99%); a small part of the base is located in the village of Ginoza (1%).

The unit conducts live-fire training and coordination with other units.

Base overview 
 Location: Nago (Toyohara, Henoko, Kushi, Kyoda, Sukuta, Yofuke), Ginoza Village (Matsuda)
 Area: 20,626 thousand m2
 Area ratio by municipality: Nago City 99% (about 20.43 km 2 ), Ginoza Village 1% (about 0.2 km 2 )
 Management Unit: U.S. Marine Corps Base Command in Okinawa
 Number of landowners: 752
 Annual rent: 2,639 million yen (FY2012 results)
 Number of stationed Marine employees: 242

Adjacent to the north side of Camp Schwab is the Henoko Ordnance Storage.

Units and mission
III Marine Expeditionary Force, 3rd Marine Division (4th Marine Regiment, Combat Assault Battalion and 3rd Reconnaissance Battalion), etc. (Army, Navy, Air Force use range etc.)

Purpose of use: Dormitory, various entertainment facilities, management office and training ground

Geography

It is divided into a Schwab training area located in the inland area on the west side of Route 329 (* at the same time, National Route 331 also overlaps) and a camp area on the east coast.

The Henoko Ordnance Storage is adjacent to the north side. The Schwab training area forms the north side of a large training ground called the Central Training Area. The south side is adjacent to the Camp Hansen training area.

There is also a Marine training ground and training area on the coast for amphibious assault exercises on LSTs (tank landing ships) and amphibious vehicles. The foot of Mt. Kushidake is used as a landing area for live ammunition training and as an abandoned ammunition disposal site.

Relocation of Marine Corps Air Station Futenma

There have been various plans to relocate Marine Corps Air Station Futenma—first off the island and most recently to Camp Schwab—however,  the future of any relocation is uncertain with the election of base-opponent Onaga as Okinawa governor. Onaga won against the incumbent Nakaima who had earlier approved landfill work to move the base to Camp Schwab in Henoko. Onaga has promised to veto the landfill work needed for the new base to be built and insisted Futenma should be moved outside of Okinawa.

Incidents

Reports indicate that Agent Orange was stored and used at Camp Schwab and other US bases on Okinawa in the 1960s.  The US government denies that the toxin was present at the base and the Japanese government has declined to investigate.

On 24 March 2009 a Marine was killed and two others injured in an explosion near the base.  The Marine Corps announced that the Marines were part of an explosive ordnance disposal team preparing unexploded ordnance for disposal when the explosion occurred.

References

External links

What Okinawa Wants You to Understand about the U.S. Military Bases(PDF) from Okinawa Prefectural Office Washington DC
Japan Times Online article showing the layout of the new airport
ヘリ基地反対協　声明

Schwab
Installations of the U.S. Department of Defense in Japan
United States Armed Forces in Okinawa Prefecture